is a Japanese politician of the Democratic Party of Japan, a member of the House of Councillors in the Diet (national legislature). A native of Kagoshima, Kagoshima and graduate of the University of Tokyo, he was elected to the House of Councillors for the first time in 1998 after serving in the House of Representatives for two terms since 1990.

References

External links 
  in Japanese.

Democratic Party of Japan politicians
Government ministers of Japan
Living people
Members of the House of Representatives (Japan)
Ministers of Justice of Japan
People from Kagoshima
University of Tokyo alumni
1954 births